Ignacio "Nacho" Quintana Navarro (born 23 February 2001) is a Spanish professional footballer who plays for Sevilla Atlético.

Early life 
Born in Seseña, Toledo, Nacho Quintana came through the youth ranks of Atlético Madrid, where he played in the Youth League, scoring several goals and assists in the process.

Club career 
Quintana joined Sevilla Atlético on the summer 2020, soon becoming a regular with the Sevillan reserve team and eventually signing a professional contract with the Andalusian club in November 2021, not long after having been called to the first team by Julen Lopetegui.

He made his professional debut for Sevilla FC on 6 January 2022, replacing Lucas Ocampos during a 2–0 away Copa del Rey win against Real Zaragoza.

Style of play 
An attacking midfielder, Nacho Quintana is able to play both as a winger or even a center forward, he is seen as a fast and powerful offensively-minded footballer, able to bring vertical movements into his team.

References

External links

2001 births
Living people
Spanish footballers
Association football midfielders
Sportspeople from the Province of Toledo
Sevilla Atlético players
Primera Federación players